Edward Chen may also refer to:

 Edward Chen (actor) (born 1996), Taiwanese actor and singer
 Edward Chen (politician) (born 1945), Hong Kong politician and academic
 Edward M. Chen (born 1953), American federal judge